The Other Son (original title: Le Fils de l'Autre) is a 2012 French drama film directed by Lorraine Lévy.

Plot 
The film centers on Joseph Silberg (Jules Sitruk), who is about to turn 18 years old and serve in the Israeli Defense Forces. During routine tests, his family discovers his blood type is different from theirs. Through further testing, including DNA testing, the family discovers that Joseph is not their son.

An investigation is conducted by the hospital Joseph was born in. Due to a bombing attack that occurred on the night he was born, Joseph and another baby were taken to shelters for safety and switched by mistake. The hospital administrator contacts the family of the other baby, who happen to be Palestinian. Their baby, Yacine Al Bezaaz, was born on the same night.

The story develops reflecting the issues of the Israeli–Palestinian conflict in which both fathers are reluctant to accept the situation while the mothers are more open to the possibility of becoming close with their biological children. As the boys become friends, their families have to re-evaluate their beliefs and xenophobia prior to connecting with their true identity.

Cast 

 Emmanuelle Devos as Orith Silberg
 Pascal Elbé as Alon Silberg
 Jules Sitruk as Joseph Silberg
 Mehdi Dehbi as Yacine Al Bezaaz
 Areen Omari as Leïla Al Bezaaz
 Khalifa Natour as Saïd Al Bezaaz
 Mahmud Shalaby as Bilal Al Bezaaz
 Diana Zriek as Amina
 Marie Wisselmann as Keren
 Bruno Podalydès as David
 Ezra Dagan as the rabbi
 Tamar Shem Or as Yona
 Tomer Offner as Ilan
 Noa Manor as Ethel
 Shira Naor as Lisa
 Gilles Ben David as hospital director

See also
 Kleinruppin Forever (2004 film)

References

External links 
 
 The Other Son at Cohen Media Group

2012 films
2012 drama films
French drama films
Israeli–Palestinian conflict films
Films directed by Lorraine Lévy
2010s French films